Vladimir Alekseyevich Mikhaylov (born 7 October 1939) is a Russian professional football coach and a former player.

Honours
 Soviet Top League champion: 1965.
 Soviet Top League bronze: 1968.
 Soviet Cup winner: 1968.

External links
 

1939 births
Living people
Soviet footballers
FC Torpedo Moscow players
FC Lokomotiv Moscow players
FC Fakel Voronezh players
Soviet football managers
Russian football managers
FC Kuban Krasnodar managers
FC Rubin Kazan managers
FC Chernomorets Novorossiysk managers
FC Asmaral Moscow managers
FC Metallurg Lipetsk managers
Association football midfielders
FC Volga Nizhny Novgorod players